Diaca River may refer to:

Diaca, a tributary of the Bistrița in Suceava County, Romania
Diaca, a tributary of the Coșna in Suceava County, Romania